Orthomycotina is a clade of fungi containing Agaricomycotina and Ustilaginomycotina, or all Basidiomycete fungi except Pucciniomycotina according to the 2007 fungal phylogeny  "The Mycota: A Comprehensive Treatise on Fungi as Experimental Systems for Basic and Applied Research" and Tedersoo et al. 2018.

See also
 Basidiomycota

References

Opisthokont unranked clades
Basidiomycota